Karl Nickerl (born 9 June 1931) is an Austrian football defender who played for Austria in the 1960 European Nations' Cup. He also played for First Vienna FC.

References

1931 births
Austrian footballers
Austria international footballers
Association football defenders
First Vienna FC players
Living people